Paul Edward Pellew, 10th Viscount Exmouth, 9th Marquess of Olías (born 8 October 1940), is a British peer. He succeeded his father, Pownoll Pellew, 9th Viscount Exmouth (1908–1970), on the latter's death.

Despite succeeding to the peerage in 1970, he did not make his maiden speech in the House of Lords until 20 December 1995. He opened his speech, which was on the subject of chequebook journalism, with a statement that his main interests lay with the tourist industry.

In 1999, he was recognized by the Spanish government as the Marquess of Olías, a title in the Spanish nobility that dates from 1652 and was previously held by his mother, María Luisa de Urquijo y Losada.

Arms

References

External links

|-

1940 births
Living people
Paul
British people of Spanish descent
Olias

Exmouth